Copelatus sulcatus is a species of diving beetle. It is part of the subfamily Copelatinae in the family Dytiscidae. It was described by Sharp in 1882.

References

sulcatus
Beetles described in 1882